Alexander Greive (born 13 May 1999) is a New Zealand professional footballer who plays for Scottish club St Mirren, as a striker.

Club career
Grieve played youth football with Papakura City and Waitakere City. He began his senior career with Birkenhead United in New Zealand's NRFL Premier in 2015, at 15 years of age.

Greive played college soccer with the  Northern Kentucky Norse, also appearing at club level for the Cincinnati Dutch Lions in 2019 whilst studying. Greive spent the 2020–21 season with Waitakere United in the New Zealand Football Championship. After playing with Birkenhead United, scoring 19 goals in 19 games in the 2021 season, and winning the Northern League Golden Boot, he signed for Scottish club St Mirren in January 2022.

International career
On 26 January 2022, Greive earned his first call-up to the New Zealand national team for friendly matches against Jordan and Uzbekistan as a late replacement for Andre de Jong. He made his international debut in the match against Jordan, appearing as an 82nd minute substitute. In his first start for New Zealand on 24 March 2022 he scored two goals, his first international goals.

International goals

Honours
Individual
 Northern League Golden Boot: 2021
 Northern League MVP: 2021

References

1999 births
Living people
New Zealand association footballers
New Zealand international footballers
Papakura City FC players
Waitakere City FC players
Birkenhead United AFC players
Northern Kentucky Norse men's soccer players
Cincinnati Dutch Lions players
Waitakere United players
St Mirren F.C. players
USL League Two players
New Zealand Football Championship players
New Zealand National League players
Scottish Professional Football League players
Association football forwards
New Zealand expatriate association footballers
New Zealand expatriates in the United States
Expatriate soccer players in the United States
New Zealand expatriates in Scotland
Expatriate footballers in Scotland